Ferdinand Philipp Maria August Raphael of Saxe-Coburg and Gotha (28 March 1844 – 3 July 1921) was the second prince of Saxe-Coburg and Gotha and lord of Csábrág and , both in modern-day Slovakia.

Life
Born in the Tuileries Palace in Paris as Ferdinand Philipp Maria August Raphael of Saxe-Coburg and Gotha, he was the eldest son of August, prince of Saxe-Coburg and Gotha. His mother, Clémentine of Orléans, was a daughter of King Louis Philippe I of France.  He was a member of the Catholic Koháry line of the Saxe-Coburg and Gotha-Koháry and an elder brother of Ferdinand, tsar of Bulgaria.

In 1870, he became a Major in the Hungarian army.  He was a close confidant to his brother-in-law, Crown Prince Rudolf.  On the morning of 30 January 1889, he and Count Josef Hoyos-Sprinzenstein and valet Johann Loschek discovered the bodies of Rudolf and his teenage mistress Baroness Mary Vetsera, who had also been shot dead.

He was buried in the Koháry crypt in the St. Augustin church in Coburg.

Marriage and issue
In Brussels on 4 February/4 May 1875, Philipp married Louise, princess of Belgium, both his second cousin and first cousin once removed, daughter of Leopold II, king of the Belgians and granddaughter of Leopold I, king of the Belgians, brother of Philipp's grandfather Ferdinand, and Louise of Orléans, sister of Phillip's mother Clémentine.

The marriage of Philip and Louise proved disastrous and she left her husband in 1896.  In 1898, she lost parental power over her children and on 15 January 1906, the divorce was pronounced in Gotha.  The reason for the separation was her long-standing relationship with Count Géza of Mattachich-Keglevich (1867-1923), with whom Philipp had dueled on the orders of Emperor Franz Josef I.  Louise had had other affairs before she met Géza, among others with Philipp's adjutant.

They had two children: 
Leopold Clement Philipp August Maria (19 July 1878, Szent-Antal, Hungary - 27 April 1916, Vienna); he died when a former lover flung acid in his face.
Dorothea Maria Henriette Auguste Louise (30 April 1881, Vienna - 21 January 1967, Taxis, Württemberg), married on 2 August 1898 to Ernst Günther, duke of Schleswig-Holstein-Sonderburg-Augustenburg.

Numismatics 
Prince Philip had an important collection of coins from Saxony, the East and overseas.  He published about Oriental numismatics.  His coin collection was auctioned in 1928 by the auction house Leo Hamburger in Frankfurt. Several commemorative medals were issued during his lifetime, for example in 1875 on the occasion of his marriage to Louise and in the same year for his honorary membership of the Belgian Numismatic Society.

Honours

Ancestry

Footnotes 

1844 births
1921 deaths
Nobility from Paris
House of Saxe-Coburg-Gotha-Koháry
Princes of Saxe-Coburg and Gotha
Knights of Malta
Annulled Honorary Knights Grand Cross of the Royal Victorian Order
Annulled Honorary Knights Grand Cross of the Order of the Bath
Knights of the Golden Fleece of Austria
Grand Crosses of the Order of Saint-Charles